Where is Mama or Where's Mama, is a short Chinese animated film produced by Shanghai Animation Film Studio in 1960 under the artistic guidance of Te Wei. The narrated film describes the adventures and misadventures of a group of tadpoles in search of their mother. It is one of Te Wei's first attempts to break away from Western style animation and aim for a painterly style influenced by Qi Baishi and more in keeping with native Chinese aesthetic sensibilities. Because of its simple story line and repetitive script it is ideal for children who are beginning their study of the Chinese language.

Creators

References

External links 
 

1960 animated films
1960 films
Chinese animated short films
Chinese animated films
Films directed by Te Wei
Films shot in Shanghai